The Midway Field Well 2-6 is a California Historical Landmark number 581 in Kern County, California. The oil well is the first gusher in Kern County and hit oil in 1909. Midway Field Well 2-6 help start the great oil boom in California, located in the Midway-Sunset Oil Field. The oil well became a California State Historical Landmark No. 581 on May 1, 1957. The well is located on Mocal Road, Fellows, California. The well was built by Fred C. Ripley. Fellows is a small town 33 miles west of Bakersfield, California.

First worked for Fred C. Ripley was working for Santa Fe Railway coast lines as the assistant manager of oil properties. He changed job and in 1904 became the manager the Chanslor-Canfield Midway Oil Company till 1947.

 California State Historical Landmark reads:
NO. 581 WELL, 2-6 - Near an area of small 40- and 50-barrel wells, it blew in over the derrick top November 27, 1909, with a production of 2,000 barrels a day and started one of the greatest oil booms California ever experienced. Well 2-6 was located as a wildcat, on June 1, 1909 by Fred C. Ripley.

See also
California Historical Landmarks in Kern County
California Historical Landmark

References

California Historical Landmarks